Mount Carmel Academy (MCA) is a secondary school located at 7155 Ashburn Street in the Garden Villas area of Houston, Texas, United States. Mount Carmel is a contract charter school of the Houston Independent School District.

Mount Carmel Academy was established in 2008 to serve students formerly attending Mount Carmel High School, a Catholic school of the Roman Catholic Archdiocese of Galveston-Houston that closed in 2008.

Sports, clubs and activities
Student Council
Newman Club
Cooking Club
Video Game and Anime Club
Reading and Crafts
Board Games Club
Cheer-leading
Spanish Club (active only during Hispanic Heritage month)
Sports: Football, basketball, baseball, softball, soccer

References

External links

 Mount Carmel Academy

Houston Independent School District high schools
Public high schools in Houston
Charter schools in Houston